René Karlen (born 18 April 1907, date of death unknown) was a Swiss basketball player. He competed in the men's tournament at the 1936 Summer Olympics.

References

1907 births
Year of death missing
Swiss men's basketball players
Olympic basketball players of Switzerland
Basketball players at the 1936 Summer Olympics
Place of birth missing